Zaidal (also spelled Zaydal) is a town in the Homs Governorate of central Syria, just east of Homs, forming a part of its suburbs. Nearby localities include Fairouzeh to the south and the Homs neighborhoods of Karm al-Zaitun, al-Sabil and al-Zahra to the west. According to the Central Bureau of Statistics (CBS), Zaidal had a population of 5,710 in 2004. The town has a large Christian community.

Notable people 
 Rosemary Barkett (1939-): American judge and former nun, whose parents were from Zeidal. 
 Ramón Exeni (1938-): Argentine recognized physician, whose father was from Zeidal.

References

Populated places in Homs District
Syriac Orthodox Christian communities in Syria